Roberto Peraza Santos (born 12 April 1995 in La Habana Province, Cuba) is a Cuban footballer who plays for La Habana.

Club career
Accompanied by fellow Cuban Alberto Gómez, Peraza transferred to Dominican Republic club Atlético Vega Real in April 2017.

On the 18th day of the 2017 Liga Dominicana de Fútbol, playing for Bauger, the midfielder was chosen as the Player of the Week for his transcendent performances in a 2–0 win over Universidad O&M FC, earning two penalties and netting one goal.

International career
He made his international debut for Cuba in an October 2016 friendly match against the United States, his only cap as of January 2018.

References

External links
 

1995 births
Living people
Cuban footballers
Cuba international footballers
Cuba youth international footballers
Association football midfielders
Atlético Vega Real players
Bauger FC players
Don Bosco Jarabacoa FC players
Liga Dominicana de Fútbol players
Cuban expatriate footballers
Expatriate footballers in the Dominican Republic
Cuban expatriate sportspeople in the Dominican Republic
2015 CONCACAF U-20 Championship players
People from La Habana Province